Mr. Bruce may refer to:

 The stage name of Ian Bruce (painter), English painter and musical artist, former member of electro-swing duo The Correspondents
 Mr. Bruce, bassist for Russian hip-hop and rap group Bad Balance

See also
 Bruce (disambiguation)